South Kowloon was a constituency elected by electoral college for the Legislative Council of Hong Kong in 1985 and 1988, which elects one member of the Legislative Council using the multiple-round elimination system and preferential elimination system respectively. The constituency covers Mong Kok District and Yau Ma Tei District (now Yau Tsim Mong District) in Kowloon.

The constituency is indirectly elected, with members of the District Boards and Urban Council from the two Districts as the electorates. It was replaced by Kowloon West constituency in 1991.

Returned members
Elected members are as follows:

Election results 
Only the final results of the run-off are shown.

References 

Constituencies of Hong Kong
Kowloon
Constituencies of Hong Kong Legislative Council
1985 establishments in Hong Kong
Constituencies established in 1985